KMMR is a broadcast radio station licensed to Malta, Montana, serving Malta and Phillips County, Montana.  KMMR broadcasts a Full Service format, featuring agricultural news/talk and various music formats.  KMMR is owned and operated by KMMR Radio, Inc.

References

External links
 KMMR Radio Online
 

1980 establishments in Montana
Full service radio stations in the United States
Phillips County, Montana
Radio stations established in 1980
MMR